Danielithosia mesospila is a moth of the family Erebidae. It is found in China (Sichuan).

References

Moths described in 2000
Lithosiina